The 19021 Bandra Terminus–Lucknow Weekly Express is an express train belonging to Indian Railways – Western Railways zone that runs between Bandra Terminus and  in India.

It operates as train number 19021 from Bandra Terminus to Lucknow Junction and as train number 19022 in the reverse direction.

Coaches 

The train has standard LHB rakes with a max speed of 110 kmph. The train consists of 20 coaches:

 2 AC II Tier
 4 AC III Tier
 8 Sleeper coaches
 4 General Unreserved
 2 End-on Generator

As with most train services in India, coach composition may be amended at the discretion of Indian Railways depending on demand.

Service

19021 Bandra Terminus–Lucknow Weekly Express covers the distance of 1687 kilometres in 30 hours 20 mins (56 km/hr) & 1687 kilometres in 32 hours 25 mins (52 km/hr) as 19022 Lucknow–Bandra Terminus Weekly Express.

As the average speed of the train is above 55 km/hr, as per Indian Railways rules, its fare doesn't include a Superfast surcharge.

Route and halts

The important halts of the train are:

Schedule

Rake sharing

The train shares its rake with 22917/22918 Bandra Terminus–Haridwar Express.

Direction reversal

Traction

A Vadodara-based WAP-4E or WAP-5 hauls the train from Bandra Terminus until  after which a Ratlam-based WDM-3A or WDM-3D or WDP-4D hauls the train for the remainder of its journey until Lucknow Junction.

References

Transport in Mumbai
Railway services introduced in 2014
Express trains in India
Rail transport in Maharashtra
Rail transport in Gujarat
Rail transport in Rajasthan
Passenger trains originating from Lucknow